Vossevangen or Voss is the administrative centre of Voss municipality in Vestland county, Norway.

Location
The villages of Borstrondi and Kvitheim are both small suburbs located just north of Vossevangen.

The European route E16 highway and the Bergensbanen railway line both run through the village.  The railway line stops at Voss Station in the centre of the village. This is the main road and main railway line between the cities of Oslo and Bergen.  The Norwegian National Road 13 also runs through the village.

Etymology
Vossevangen takes its name from the Old Norwegian word "vang" (Old Norse: Vangr) which means "field" or "meadow", and refers to the large grass field lying between Voss Church and the lake Vangsvatnet.

History

According to legend, the people of Voss were forcibly converted to Christianity by King Olav, who later became St. Olav. A stone cross situated in Vossevangen is said to have been erected at this time. The town contains the stone Voss Church from 1277, with a 16th-century eccentric, octagonal steeple. Just outside the village is Finnesloftet, a wooden guildhall believed to be the oldest profane (non-sacred) wooden building in Northern Europe.

After the German invasion of Norway on 9 April 1940, Voss was the main point of mobilisation for the Norwegian Army in the west, as the city of Bergen had already fallen on the first day of the invasion. Although most of the troops mobilised here were transferred by railway to the fighting in the east of the country, the German forces, advancing towards Voss along the railway line from Bergen and from the Hardangerfjord, were met with stiff resistance. In Hardanger (to the south), some of the Germans climbed up the mountains from Ålvik while the rest went through Granvin.

To break down this resistance, the village of Vossevangen was bombed by the Luftwaffe on 24 and 25 April 1940. About a dozen civilians lost their lives in the bombing which completely destroyed the old wood-built town centre. On 26 April, the German forces entered the village, which remained occupied until 8 May 1945.

References

Villages in Vestland
Voss